A micellar solution consists of a dispersion of micelles in a solvent (most usually water). Micelles consist of aggregated amphiphiles, and in a micellar solution these are in equilibrium with free, unaggregated amphiphiles. Micellar solutions form when the concentration of amphiphile exceeds the critical micellar concentration (CMC) or critical aggregation concentration - CAC, and persist until the amphiphile concentration becomes sufficiently high to form a lyotropic liquid crystal phase.

Although micelles are often depicted as being spherical, they can be cylindrical or oblate depending on the chemical structure of the amphiphile. Micellar solutions are isotropic phases.

Micellar originates from France, with its usage in skincare dating back to 1913. Its popularity boomed internationally when French pharmaceutical company Bioderma released their product Sensibio H2O micellar water in 1991, which is said to be sold every 2 seconds worldwide today.

Commercial uses
Micellar water is used to remove makeup and oil from the face.

References

Colloidal chemistry